Joseph Leonard Ullman (30 January 1923, in Buffalo, New York – 11 September 1995, in Chelsea, Michigan) was a mathematician who worked on classical analysis with a focus on approximation theory.

Ullman received his A.B. from the University of Buffalo and his graduate studies were interrupted by service in the U.S. Army in World War II. He was injured, received a Purple Heart, and spent the rest of the war as a mathematics instructor. He received a Ph.D. in 1949 from Stanford University with thesis Studies on Faber Polynomials under the direction of Gábor Szegő. Ullman became an instructor at the University of Michigan in 1949, an assistant professor in 1954, an associate professor in 1962, and a professor in 1966.

He wrote forty-three research papers. During his career at the University of Michigan he supervised eleven doctoral theses.

Selected works
 
 
 
 with R. C. Lyndon: 
 
 
 
 with Matthew F. Wyneken: 
 with Vilmos Totik:

References

External links

American mathematicians
1923 births
1995 deaths
Approximation theorists
University of Michigan faculty
20th-century American mathematicians
University at Buffalo alumni
United States Army personnel of World War II
Stanford University alumni